Palaemon gravieri is a species of shrimp of the family Palaemonidae. They are found in Korea.

References

Palaemonidae
Crustaceans described in 1930